Kabuto Station is the name of multiple train stations in Japan:

 Kabuto Station (Fukushima) (兜駅)
 Kabuto Station (Ishikawa) (甲駅) (closed)
 Kabuto Station (Mie) (加太駅)